Gary Craig Scott (born 3 February 1978 in Liverpool, England) is an English footballer, who was last attached to Altrincham.

Scott made his debut for Altrincham on 3 October 2000, against Stalybridge Celtic.

Honours

Club
Leigh RMI
Peter Swales Challenge Shield (1): 1999–2000

References

External links

1978 births
Living people
English footballers
National League (English football) players
English Football League players
Association football defenders
Tranmere Rovers F.C. players
Rotherham United F.C. players
Leigh Genesis F.C. players
Altrincham F.C. players
Footballers from Liverpool